Jeri is a surname and given name. Notable people with the name include:

Given name
 Jeri Campbell (born 1970), American figure skater
 Jeri Ellsworth (born 1974), American entrepreneur and computer chip designer
 Jeri Laber (born 1931), American activist and writer
 Jeri Redcorn (born 1939), Oklahoman pottery artist
 Jeri Ryan (born 1968), American actress
 Jeri Sitzes (born 1979), American boxer, kickboxer and Muay Thai fighter
 Jeri Southern (1926–1991), American jazz pianist and singer born Genevieve Hering
 Jeri Taylor (born 1938), American television scriptwriter
 Jeri Kehn Thompson (born 1966), American radio host

Surname
 Vanessa Jeri (born 1980), Peruvian comedic actress

Fictional characters
 Jeryn Jeri Hogarth, in the Marvel Netflix series Jessica Jones
 Jeri Katou, in the television series Digimon Tamers

See also
 Jeri or Jheri curl, a hairstyle popular in the 1980s and '90s
 Jerry (name)
 Jèrri, the name of Jersey in the local Jèrriais language